PA-28 may refer to:
 Pennsylvania's 28th congressional district
 Pennsylvania Route 28, a highway
 Piper PA-28 Cherokee light aircraft